Valeric acid or  pentanoic acid is a straight-chain alkyl carboxylic acid with the chemical formula . Like other low-molecular-weight carboxylic acids, it has an unpleasant odor.  It is found in the perennial flowering plant Valeriana officinalis, from which it gets its name. Its primary use is in the synthesis of its esters. Salts and esters of valeric acid are known as valerates or pentanoates. Volatile esters of valeric acid tend to have pleasant odors and are used in perfumes and cosmetics. Several, including ethyl valerate and pentyl valerate are used as food additives because of their fruity flavors.

History
Valeric acid is a minor constituent of the perennial flowering plant valerian (Valeriana officinalis), from which it gets its name. The dried root of this plant has been used medicinally since antiquity. The related isovaleric acid shares its unpleasant odor and their chemical identity was investigated  by oxidation of the components of fusel alcohol, which includes the five-carbon amyl alcohols.
Valeric acid is one volatile component in swine manure.  Other components include other carboxylic acids, skatole, trimethyl amine, and isovaleric acid. It is also a flavor component in some foods.

Manufacture
In industry, valeric acid is produced by the oxo process from 1-butene and syngas, forming valeraldehyde, which is oxidised to the final product.

  valeric acid

It can also be produced from biomass-derived sugars via levulinic acid and this alternative has received considerable attention as a way to produce biofuels.

Reactions
Valeric acid reacts as a typical carboxylic acid: it can form amide, ester, anhydride, and chloride derivatives. The latter, valeryl chloride is commonly used as the intermediate to obtain the others.

Uses
Valeric acid occurs naturally in some foods but is also used as a food additive. Its safety in this application was reviewed by an FAO and WHO panel, who concluded that there were no safety concerns at the likely levels of intake. The compound is used for the preparation of derivatives, notably its volatile esters which, unlike the parent acid, have pleasant odors and fruity flavors and hence find applications in perfumes, cosmetics and  foodstuffs. Typical examples are the methyl valerates, ethyl valerates, and pentyl valerates.

Biology
In humans, valeric acid is a minor product of the gut microbiome and can also be produced by metabolism of its esters found in food. The restoration of levels of this acid in the gut has been suggested as the mechanism that results in control of Clostridioides difficile infection after fecal microbiota transplant.

Valerate salts and esters
It is the form found in biological systems at physiological pH. A valerate, or pentanoate, compound is a carboxylate salt or ester of valeric acid.
Many steroid-based pharmaceuticals, for example ones based on betamethasone or hydrocortisone, include the steroid as the valerate ester.

Examples
Methyl valerate
Ethyl valerate
Pentyl valerate
Betamethasone valerate
Estradiol valerate
Hydrocortisone valerate
Testosterone valerate

See also 

 List of saturated fatty acids
 List of carboxylic acids
 4-Hydroxy-4-methylpentanoic acid
 Pivalic acid (2,2-dimethylpropanoic acid)
 3-Methylbutanoic acid, also called isovaleric acid

References 

GABA analogues
Fatty acids
Alkanoic acids
Foul-smelling chemicals